The 1906–07 Cincinnati Bearcats men's basketball team represented the University of Cincinnati during the 1906–07 college men's basketball season. The head coach was Amos Foster, coaching his third season with the Bearcats.

The opponents and scores of six of the games is incomplete. Though the overall record is known, only the details of the following three games are on record.

Schedule

|-

References

Cincinnati Bearcats men's basketball seasons
Cincinnati
Cincinnati Bearcats men's basketball team
Cincinnati Bearcats men's basketball team